Cuproxena flintana is a species of moth of the family Tortricidae. It is found in Jalisco, Mexico.

References

Moths described in 1991
Cuproxena